The Q factor of a bicycle is the distance between the pedal attachment points on the crank arms, when measured parallel to the bottom bracket axle.  It may also be referred to as the "tread" of the crankset.  The term was coined by Grant Petersen during his time at Bridgestone Bicycles. The "Q" stands for "quack", a reference to the wide stance and waddling gait of ducks.

Q factor is a function of both the bottom bracket width (axle length) and the cranks. Bottom brackets axles vary in length from 102mm to 127mm. Mountain bike cranks are typically about 20mm wider than road cranks.

A larger Q factor (wider tread) will mean less cornering clearance (while pedaling) for the same bottom bracket height and crank length. A smaller Q factor (narrower tread) is desirable on faired recumbent bicycles because then the fairing can also be narrower, hence smaller and lighter.  Sheldon Brown said that a narrower tread is ergonomically superior because it more closely matches the nearly-inline track of human footsteps.

Research from the University of Birmingham in the United Kingdom suggests narrower Q factors are more efficient, likely due to improved application of force during the pedal stroke, as well the potential for reduced knee variability and risk of injury.

References

Bicycle parts